The Philippines participated at the 2019 Summer Universiade in Naples, Italy, from 3 to 14 July 2019.

Federation of School Sports Association of the Philippines Board Chairman Alvin Tai Lian served as the chef de mission of the Philippine delegation to the games.

EJ Obiena won a gold medal for the Philippines by besting the men's pole vault event.

Medal summary

Athletics

References

Philippines at the Summer Universiade
2019 in Philippine sport
Nations at the 2019 Summer Universiade